Alexey Albertovich Garnizoff (born 25 February 1963) is a Russian music composer, director and producer; a Meritorious Artist of Russia.

Biography
Alexis Garnizoff was born on 25 February 1963, in Melitopol, Ukrainian SSR, Soviet Union.

In 1977 he moved to Moscow to continue his studies. In 1985 Alexey graduated from Russian Academy of Theatre Arts. His first teacher was Joachim G. Sharoyev. As the principal director of the Academic Musical Theater of Opera and Ballet Stanislavsky and Nemirovich-Danchenko, he noticed Alexei and took to his assistant. At the I.G.Sharoevym he put 8 operas, and by the end of the Institute Alexey Garnizov in the asset were already posing serious.

Evzerov songs into the repertoire of artists such as  Valery Leontiev, Philip Kirkorov, Larisa Dolina, Nikolai Baskov, Tamara Gverdtsiteli, Irina Allegrova, Irina Allegrova, Mikhail Shufutinsky.

References

External links
 Alexis Garnizoff biography

1963 births
Living people
20th-century composers
21st-century composers
Honored Artists of the Russian Federation
People from Melitopol
Russian Academy of Theatre Arts alumni
Russian male composers
Russian record producers
20th-century Russian male musicians
21st-century Russian male musicians